Parviz (also Romanized as Parvīz; also known as Deh-e Parvīz) is a village in Ladiz Rural District, in the Central District of Mirjaveh County, Sistan and Baluchestan Province, Iran. At the 2006 census, its population was 183, in 31 families.

References 

Populated places in Mirjaveh County